Crenosomatidae is a family of nematodes belonging to the order Rhabditida.

Genera:
 Crenosoma Molin, 1861
 Molinofilaria Vuylsteke, 1956
 Otostrongylus de Bruyn, 1933
 Paracrenosoma Yun & Kontramavichus, 1963
 Prestwoodia Anderson, 1978
 Troglostrongylus Vevers, 1923

References

Nematodes